Australargyria is a genus of moths of the family Crambidae. It contains only one species, Australargyria fulvinotellus, which is found on the Louisiade Archipelago.

References

Crambinae
Monotypic moth genera
Moths of New Guinea
Crambidae genera
Taxa named by Stanisław Błeszyński
Taxa described in 1970